The Tunisian Order of Lawyers is a non-profit Tunisian organization and the bar association of the country. All lawyers in Tunisia are members of the Order, which does not belong to any political party. The headquarters of the Order are located in Tunis. The Tunisian National Dialogue Quartet, of which the Tunisian Order of Lawyers forms part, was announced as the laureate of the 2015 Nobel Peace Prize on October 9, 2015, for its role building a constitutional democracy following the Tunisian Revolution.

In July 2015, the president of the Order was Mohamed Fadhel Mahfoudh.

Members 
 Abdelmonem Achour

References

Tunisian Revolution
Political organisations based in Tunisia